The women's triple jump at the 2018 IAAF World Indoor Championships took place on 3 March 2018.

Summary
With 17 finalists, a qualifying round was barely avoided.  In the competition, defending champion Yulimar Rojas took the lead as the first jumper down the runway with a 14.24m.  Near the end of the round, Keturah Orji jumped 14.13m to take over second.  Then two jumps later, Kimberly Williams took over the lead with a 14.37m.  Williams improved upon that in her next two attempts taking the lead out to 14.48m.  Rojas also improved to 14.36m.  In the third round, Andreea Panturoiu moved past Orji with a 14.16m.  At the end of the round Ana Peleteiro moved past Panturoiu with a 14.18m.  In the fourth round, Panturoiu jumped her best of the day, 14.33m to move back into silver position only until Peleteiro jumped 14.40m on the next jump.  On the next jump, Rojas displaced Panturoiu with a 14.36m.  On her fifth attempt, Rojas finally settled the competition with the winner  to repeat as champion.

Results
The final was started at 11:00.

References

Triple jump
Triple jump at the World Athletics Indoor Championships
2018 in women's athletics